D. W. Burley was a state legislator in Texas. He served in the Texas House of Representatives. He was in St. Louis during the American Civil War and came to Texas after it. He was elected in 1870 and only lasted one term.

See also
African-American officeholders during and following the Reconstruction era

References

Republican Party members of the Texas House of Representatives
1844 births
Year of death missing